The Phytalmiinae are a subfamily of tephritid fruit flies.

Systematics
The Phytalmiinae are grouped into four tribes:

 Acanthonevrini: 281 species in the following 76 genera:
Acanthonevra, Acanthonevroides, Aethiothemara, Afrocneros, Alloeomyia, Anchiacanthonevra, Antisophira, Aridonevra, Austronevra, Austrorioxa, Buloloa, Chaetomerella, Cheesmanomyia, Cleitamiphanes, Clusiosoma (subgenera Clusiosoma and Paraclusiosoma), Clusiosomina, Copiolepis, Cribrorioxa, Dacopsis, Diarrhegma, Dirioxa, Ectopomyia, Emheringia, Enicopterina, Enoplopteron, Exallosophira, Felderimyia, Freyomyia, Gressittidium, Griphomyia, Hemiclusiosoma, Hexacinia, Hexamela, Hexaresta, Labeschatia, Langatia, Loriomyia, Lumirioxa, Lyronotum, Micronevrina, Mimoeuphranta, Neothemara, Nothoclusiosoma, Ocnerioxa, Orienticaelum, Paedohexacinia, Parachlaena, Phorelliosoma, Polyara, Polyaroidea, Pseudacanthoneura, Pseudacrotoxa, Pseudoneothemara, Ptilona, Ptiloniola, Quasirhabdochaeta, Rabaulia, Rabauliomorpha, Rioxa, Saucromyia, Sophira (subgenera Kambangania, Parasophira, Soosina and Sophira), Sophiroides, Sophiropsis, Staurellina, Stigmatomyia, Stymbara, Taeniorioxa, Termitorioxa, Themara, Themarictera, Themarohystrix, Themaroides, Themaroidopsis, Tritaeniopteron, Trypanocentra (subgenera Clusiomorpha and Trypanocentra) and Walkeraitia.
 Epacrocerini: 7 species in the following 4 genera:
Epacrocerus, Proepacrocerus, Tanymetopus and Udamolobium.
 Phascini: 14 species in the following 6 genera:
Diarrhegmoides, Homoiothemara, Othniocera, Paraphasca, Phasca and Xenosophira.
 Phytalmiini: 22 species included in the following 4 genera:
Diplochorda, Ortaloptera, Phytalmia and Sessilina.

Seven species in the next five genera are not included in any of the above tribes:
Colobostroter, Matsumurania, Pseudosophira, Robertsomyia and Terastiomyia.

References
 Fruit Fly Classification and Diversity Table